Stafford "Staff" King (October 27, 1893 – August 21, 1970) was a Minnesota Republican politician who served as Minnesota State Auditor nearly four decades.

Life and career

King was born in 1893 in Fair Haven, Minnesota to Cyrus Murdock King and Minnie King (née Cooper). His parents were the descendants of early settlers of the state and had been involved in local causes and politics in and around Itasca County, Minnesota. He was raised on the family homestead in Itasca County and attended school in Deer River, Minnesota. Later he attended the University of Minnesota and the St. Paul College of Law.

During World War I King served in the army, first as an enlisted soldier on the Mexican border and later as a first lieutenant. After the war he worked in a variety of state and local government positions and also became active with the American Legion. In 1930 he won election as Minnesota State Auditor, a position he held for ten terms. During World War II he left his position on an unpaid leave of absence to serve as a lieutenant colonel with the United States Air Force.

Between his political connections as state auditor and his social connections through various civic and community organizations, King made several attempts to win higher office (most notably running in the Republican primaries for governor against Luther Youngdahl in 1947 and against C. Elmer Anderson in 1952).

King retired from office in 1969, and died just over a year later in 1970.  After his death, a review of his personal papers found he was a member of the Ku Klux Klan.

References

Minnesota Republicans
1893 births
1970 deaths
United States Army personnel of World War I
University of Minnesota alumni
William Mitchell College of Law alumni
United States Army Air Forces personnel of World War II
United States Army colonels
United States Army Air Forces officers
American Ku Klux Klan members